Solstice Coil is an alternative progressive rock band formed in Israel in 2001. The band's core members are Shir Deutch, Opher Vishnia and Shai Yallin.

The band describes its musical style on its official website as "combining the emotional with the intellectual", and proclaims itself as "Israel's first alt-prog-rock band to be formed on the web".

Solstice Coil has released three albums, A Prescription for Paper Cuts (2005), Natural Causes (2011) and Commute (2015). Natural Causes had been picked up by the Orlando-based progressive rock label Melodic Revolution Records and Commute was released on Taklit Music, Subterranean Masquerade guitarist Tomer Pink's new label.

On July 5, 2011, Solstice Coil released a parody of Dream Theater to YouTube titled "The Natural Causes Carries On", spoofing Dream Theater's "The Spirit Carries On" documentary about their search to replace founding member and drummer Mike Portnoy. The video became immensely popular among Dream Theater fans and was subsequently promoted by guitarist John Petrucci on his official Facebook and Twitter accounts. Dream Theater keyboardist Jordan Rudess has also given his seal of approval, stating the video was "very funny".

On July 19, 2011, during Dream Theater's second concert in Israel, the parody was screened before thousands of fans, moments before Dream Theater took the stage.

History 
Solstice Coil was established in late-2001 with Shir Deutch on vocals and guitars, Opher Vishnia on lead guitar, Uri Goldberg on drums and Guy Matityahu on bass guitar. During the first years of its existence, the band played a mix of Hebrew and English songs, mostly influenced by Brit-pop and Brit-rock.

After going through several line-up changes, the band released its debut album, A Prescription For Paper Cuts on September 21, 2005 with bassist Diego Olschansky and keyboard player Shai Yallin; A self-produced effort, the album was mostly recorded, edited and mixed by Yallin at his home studio. Paper Cuts received positive reviews from music websites and magazines from around the world in Hebrew, English, Dutch Italian, French and German. In Israel, it received a favorable review on Mitkadem, biggest archive of progressive rock in the Hebrew language. It was named "Album of the month" on German website Babyblaue Seiten and on Brazilian website progressiverockbr.

Following a review and an interview published on Belgian progressive rock magazine Prog-résiste, the band was invited to perform at an annual progressive festival held at the Spirit of 66’ club in Belgium in 2006. The Belgian tour was covered by Israeli media.

In 2007, the band experienced more personnel changes and from then on included Deutch, Vishnia and Yallin as well as Yaniv Shalev on bass guitar and Yatziv Caspi on drums. This line-up would go on to work on the band's next album, Natural Causes, which was released on June 21, 2011 through Orlando-based label Melodic Revolution Records, with album art by digital artist Vitaly S. Alexius.

2012 saw the band through another lineup change, with Drummer Yatziv Caspi and bassist Yaniv Shalev replaced respectively with Yakir Fitousi and Mihael Galperin. Later that year, the band went on a two-week tour of India, culminating in a performance at the NH7 Weekender festival alongside, among others, Megadeth. Following the tour, the band began work on their third effort, Commute, which was released on June 21, 2015 on Taklit Music.

Style and influences 
Solstice Coil's music is a cross-genre of progressive rock, alternative rock and progressive metal. The band members state mutual influences by artists such as Radiohead, Muse, Porcupine Tree, Dream Theater, King Crimson, Genesis and The Mars Volta.

The music is characterised by complex structures, variable song lengths, unorthodox time signatures, multi-layered arrangements and wide range male vocals. The songs are often melancholic and dark, while the lyrics tend to be metaphorical and multi-faceted.

Discography 
 A Prescription for Paper Cuts (2005)
 Natural Causes (2011) Melodic Revolution Records
 Commute (2015)

Videography

Deep Child 
The band filmed its first official music video for the song Deep Child in 2006. The script was written by Shir Deutch and directed by Amir Armel over the course of three days. Deep Child featured a story arc and a cast of over 15 people, and was shot in a number of locations. While the band members were not seen playing or singing in the video, Deutch, Vishnia, Yallin and Goldberg had cameos in it.

Deep Child was broadcast on Israeli music Channel 24 and named 'Video of the Week' by My HOT V.O.D – a music video service offered by Israeli's cable company HOT.

A live version of Deep Child was released on the Prog-résiste Prog 4 Convention 2006 DVD. The video was shot during Solstice Coil's performance at the Spirit of 66’ club in Belgium.

Recipe for Eternity 
Solstice Coil's second official video and the first song to be released from Natural Causes. It included footage taken by the band itself during the Natural Causes recording sessions. Lead singer Shir Deutch edited the video, which includes shots of the band working at the studio as well as a string quartet that was recorded for the album.

"Too Many Regrets" & The Natural Causes Carries On 

On July 5, 2011, Solstice Coil released a parody of Dream Theater to YouTube titled "The Natural Causes Carries On", spoofing Dream Theater's "The Spirit Carries On" documentary about their search for a replacement for founding member and drummer Mike Portnoy. The video was written, directed and edited by Deutch.

The parody video was intended to promote the music video for Too Many Regrets, also edited by Deutch. Dream Theater guitarist John Petrucci posted the video on his Facebook and Twitter accounts, leading to over twenty thousand unique views on the band's YouTube page. Dream Theater keyboardist Jordan Rudess commented on the video with his personal YouTube account, stating the video was "very funny".
On July 19, 2011, Dream Theater screened the parody video on their Tel Aviv show, right before they went on stage.

References

External links 
 
 Solstice Coil on Prog Archives

Israeli progressive rock groups
Israeli alternative rock groups
Israeli progressive metal musical groups
Musical groups from Tel Aviv
Musical groups established in 2001